Bombus cockerelli, Cockerell's bumblebee, is a yellow and black bumblebee known only from fewer than 30 specimens, collected at a few high-altitude (over ) localities in the White Mountains of New Mexico, all within an area of less than , giving it the smallest range of any of the ~250 species of bumblebees in the world.

Description
The queens and workers are black on the head, with a few pale yellow hairs. The anterior and posterior thorax and the two basal and two terminal abdominal segments are yellow, while abdominal segments 3 and 4 are black. Males are unknown.

Another species of bumblebee, Bombus balteatus, known to occur at high altitudes in Colorado, is similar to B. cockerelli, but B. cockerelli has a shorter head, numerous intermixed black hairs on the anterior thorax, and the abdominal apex is yellow rather than rust-tinted.

History
The bee was first described in 1913, based on six specimens collected near the Rio Ruidoso in New Mexico. Between 1956 and 2011, not even one was seen.  For a time, this bee was believed to be just a subspecies and not a full species. However, given access to fresh specimens whose genetic material can be analyzed, it is expected that it will now be possible to determine whether it is a true species.

Conservation status
Despite how rarely it has been seen, the bee is not believed to be endangered or threatened, because its entire range is in U.S. National Forest and tribal lands.

Biology
Nothing is known regarding the biology of this species, other than some specimens having been collected on thistle flowers.

References 

Bumblebees
Hymenoptera of North America
Insects described in 1913